Matt McGarva (born May 26, 1991 in Surrey, British Columbia) is a professional Canadian football defensive back in the Canadian Football League who is currently a free agent. He was drafted 33rd overall in the 2013 CFL Draft by the BC Lions and signed with the club on May 27, 2013. Following his release from the Lions, he was signed by the Argonauts on May 30, 2015.  He was released by the Argonauts on June 20, 2015. 

McGarva played CIS football with the Windsor Lancers.

McGarva is an active part of BC Lions community programs. Predominantly, he is an advocate for "Being More Than A Bystander" movement to eliminate gender violence. Matt McGarva is a public speaker for other Lions programs such as "Stand Up Against Bullying" and "Read, Write and Roar." McGarva works to build football communities through coaching Lord Tweedsmuir Secondary Senior Varsity football and helping run the "Windsor's Finest Football Academy" for under-privileged youth.

References

External links
BC Lions bio
Toronto Argonauts bio 

1991 births
BC Lions players
Canadian football defensive backs
Living people
Players of Canadian football from British Columbia
Sportspeople from Surrey, British Columbia
Windsor Lancers football players